Hongsa is a district of Sainyabuli province, Laos. The main town in the district is Hongsa town, where a coal-fired power plant is located.

References 

Districts of Laos